The 1961 Segunda División Peruana, the second division of Peruvian football (soccer), was played by 10 teams. The tournament winner, KDT Nacional was promoted to the Primera División Peruana 1962.

Results

Standings

External links
 La Historia de la Segunda 1961

Peruvian Segunda División seasons
Peru2
2